The Viscount del Castillo de Almansa is a Spanish hereditary title of nobility created by Carlos III on the 3rd December 1773 for Miguel de Almansa y Uriarte. The title is currently held by José Fernando de Almansa y Moreno-Barreda, 10th Viscount of Castillo de Almansa and Grandee of Spain.

Present holder 
The present holder of the viscountcy is José Fernando de Almansa y Moreno-Barreda, 10th Viscount of Castillo Almansa. José Fernando de Almansa y Moreno-Barreda is a Spanish diplomat and former Head of the House of His Majesty the King of Spain.

Fernando Almansa studied law at the University of Deusto before entering the diplomatic service in 1974. He was stationed in Brussels, Mexico and Moscow. 

Fernando Almansa served as Head of the House of the Majesty of him King Juan Carlos I from 1993 to 2002. On June 24, 2002, the King Juan Carlos I appointed him Grandee of Spain and later, he was awarded the Grand Cross of the Order of Carlos III.

Viscounts of Castillo de Almansa 
José Fernando de Almansa y Moreno-Barreda, 1st Viscount of Castillo de Almansa
Rafael de Almansa y Uriarte, 2nd Viscount of Castillo de Almansa
Micaela de Almansa y Careaga, 3rd Viscount of Castillo de Almansa
Miguel de Almansa y Almansa, 4th Viscount of Castillo de Almansa
Miguel de Almansa y Pérez de Herrasti, 5th Viscount of Castillo de Almansa
Fernando de Almansa y Cañavate, 6th Viscount of Castillo de Almansa
Fernando de Almansa y Arroyo, 7th Viscount of Castillo de Almansa and 9th Marquess of Cadimo
José María de Almansa y Cuevas, 8th Viscount of Castillo de Almansa and 10th Marquess of Cadimo
Fernando de Almansa y Valverde, 9th Viscount of Castillo de Almansa and 11th Marquess of Cadimo
José Fernando de Almansa y Moreno-Barreda, 10th Viscount of Castillo de Almansa and Grandee of Spain

References 

Viscounts of Spain